Cifantuan, also known simply as chi faan or fantuan, is a glutinous rice dish in Chinese cuisine originating in the Jiangnan area of eastern China which encompasses Shanghai and surrounding regions. It is made by tightly wrapping a piece of youtiao (fried dough) with glutinous rice. It is usually eaten as breakfast together with sweetened or savory soy milk in its native Jiangnan. 

Today, cifantuan is commonly available in two varieties. Whereas the "savory" variety includes ingredients such as zha cai (pickled vegetable), rousong (pork floss) and small pieces of youtiao being wrapped in the rice ball, the "sweet" variety adds sugar and sometimes sesame to the filling. There are many modern variations of the food which are made from purple rice and include fillings such as tuna, kimchi, or cheese. 

Cifantuan is a major breakfast food item in Shanghai. Cifantuan is also popular in Hubei, Taiwan and Hong Kong.

See also
 List of rice dishes
 Jumeok-bap, the Korean dish of Japanese onigiri-styled rice balls, with various fillings
 Lo mai gai
 Onigiri, Japanese glutinous rice dish formed into triangular or cylindrical shapes and often wrapped in nori
 Zhaliang
 Zongzi, Chinese glutinous rice dish served with various fillings wrapped in bamboo or reed leaves.

References

External links
  What is Fan Tuan?

Chinese rice dishes
Dim sum
Glutinous rice dishes
Shanghai cuisine